Marathon (Demotic Greek: Μαραθώνας, Marathónas; Attic/Katharevousa: , Marathṓn) is a town in Greece and the site of the Battle of Marathon in 490 BCE, in which the heavily outnumbered Athenian army defeated the Persians. Legend has it that Pheidippides, a Greek herald at the battle, was sent running from Marathon to Athens to announce the victory, which is how the marathon running race was conceived in modern times. Today it is part of East Attica regional unit, in the outskirts of Athens and a popular resort town and center of agriculture.

History

The name "Marathon" comes from the herb fennel, called márathon or márathos in Ancient Greek, so Marathon literally means "a place full of fennel".
It is believed that the town was originally named so because of an abundance of fennel plants in the area.

In ancient times, Marathon occupied a small plain in the northeast of ancient Attica, which contained four places, Marathon, Probalinthus, Tricorythus, and Oenoe, which originally formed the Tetrapolis, one of the 12 districts into which Attica was divided before the time of Theseus. Here Xuthus, who married the daughter of Erechtheus, is said to have reigned; and here the Heracleidae took refuge when driven out of Peloponnesus, and defeated Eurystheus. The Marathonii claimed to be the first people in Greece who paid divine honours to Heracles, who possessed a sanctuary in the plain. Marathon is also celebrated in the legends of Theseus, who conquered the ferocious bull, which used to devastate the plain. Marathon is mentioned in Homer's Odyssey in a way that implies that it was then a place of importance. In mythology, its name was derived from an eponymous hero Marathon, who is described by Pausanias as a son of Epopeus, king of Sicyon, who fled into Attica in consequence of the cruelty of his father Plutarch calls him an Arcadian, who accompanied the Dioscuri in their expedition into Attica, and voluntarily devoted himself to death before the battle.

After Theseus united the 12 independent districts of Attica into one state, the name of Tetrapolis gradually fell into disuse; and the four places of which it consisted became Attic demi, Marathon, Tricorythus, and Oenoë belonging to the tribe Aeantis, and Probalinthus to the tribe Pandionis; but Marathon was so superior to the other three, that its name was applied to the whole district down to the latest times. Hence Lucian speaks of "the parts of Marathon about Oenoë".

Few places have obtained such celebrity in the history of the world as Marathon, on account of the victory which the Athenians here gained over the Persians in 490 BCE (Battle of Marathon). After Miltiades (the general of the Greek forces) defeated Darius' Persian forces, the Persians decided to sail from Marathon to Athens in order to sack the unprotected city. Miltiades ordered all his hoplite forces to march "double time" back to Athens, so that by the time Darius' troops arrived they saw the same Greek force waiting for them.

Although the name Marathon had a positive resonance in Europe in the nineteenth century, for some time that was sullied by the Dilessi murders, which happened nearby in 1870.

In the 19th century and beginning of twentieth century  the village was inhabited by an Arvanite population.

The sophist and magnate Herodes Atticus was born in Marathon. In 1926, the American company ULEN began construction on the Marathon Dam in a valley above Marathon, in order to ensure water supply for Athens.  It was completed in 1929. About 10 km² of forested land were flooded to form Lake Marathon.

The beach of Schinias is located southeast of the town. The beach is a popular as a spot for windsurfing spot and the Olympic Rowing Center used for the 2004 Summer Olympics is also located there. At the 1896 and 2004 Summer Olympics, Marathon was the starting point of the marathon races (for both women and men in 2004). The area is susceptible to flash flooding, because of forest fires having denuded parts of the eastern slopes of Mount Penteli especially in 2006.

Municipality
The municipality Marathon was formed at the 2011 local government reform by the merger of the following 4 former municipalities, that became municipal units:
Grammatiko
Marathon
Nea Makri
Varnavas

The municipality has an area of 222.747 km2, the municipal unit 97.062 km2.

Population

The other settlements in the municipal unit are Agios Panteleimonas (pop. 1,591), Kato Souli (2,142), Vranas (1,082), Avra (191), Vothon (177), Ano Souli (232), and Schinias (264).

Points of interest 

 The Soros, a tumulus (Greek  Τύμβος, tymbos, tomb), or burial mound, erected to the 192 Athenian fallen at the Battle of Marathon, is a feature of the coastal plain, now marked by a marble memorial stele and surrounded by a small park.

Sister cities
  Hopkinton, Massachusetts, United States
  Xiamen, China

See also
List of municipalities of Attica
List of settlements in Attica
Dimitrion Yordanidis, oldest man to have run the marathon, at age 98

Notes and references
Notes

References

Attribution

Bibliography

External links

Official web site 
www.e-marathon.gr (in Greek)

 
Venues of the 1896 Summer Olympics
Venues of the 2004 Summer Olympics
Olympic athletics venues
Olympic cycling venues
Cities in ancient Attica
Populated places in East Attica
Battle of Marathon
Demoi
Ancient Greek cities
Populated places in ancient Attica
Locations in Greek mythology
Arvanite settlements